Endel Press (16 February 1929 – 6 May 1982) was an Estonian swimmer who represented the Soviet Union in men's 1500 metre freestyle swimming at the 1952 Summer Olympics.

References

External links
 

1929 births
1982 deaths
Estonian male freestyle swimmers
Soviet male freestyle swimmers
Olympic swimmers of the Soviet Union
Swimmers at the 1952 Summer Olympics
Swimmers from Tallinn